The Pondoland cannibal snail, scientific name Natalina beyrichi, is a species of medium-sized predatory air-breathing land snail, a carnivorous terrestrial pulmonate gastropod mollusc in the family Rhytididae.

This species is endemic to South Africa. Its natural habitat is temperate forests. It is threatened by habitat loss.

It is called "cannibal" because it preys on other snails.

References

Further reading 
 Herbert, D.G. & Moussalli A. 2010. Revision of the larger cannibal snails (Natalina s. l.) of southern Africa - Natalina s. s., Afrorhytida and Capitina (Mollusca: Gastropoda: Rhytididae). African Invertebrates 51 (1): 1-132. 

Endemic fauna of South Africa
Rhytididae
Gastropods described in 1890
Taxonomy articles created by Polbot